The Island of Intrigue is a lost 1919 American silent drama film, directed by Henry Otto. It stars May Allison, Jack Mower, and Frederick Vroom, and was released on April 7, 1919.

Cast list
 May Allison as Maida Waring
 Jack Mower as Gilbert Spear
 Frederick Vroom as Thomas Waring
 Lucille Ward as Mrs. Juliet Smith
 Gordon Marr as Alaric Smith
 Lillian West as Yorna Smith
 Hector Sarno as Count Pellessier
 Tom Kennedy as Jackson, the butler
 Chance Ward as Mr. Gobel
 Edward Alexander as Jones, a sailor

References

External links 

 
 
 

1919 drama films
1919 films
Silent American drama films
American black-and-white films
American silent feature films
Metro Pictures films
Films directed by Henry Otto
Lost American films
1919 lost films
Lost drama films
1910s American films